Soudena (Greek: Σουδενά) may refer to the following places in Greece:

Soudena Agiou Vasileiou, the former name of Kato Lousoi, Kalavryta municipality, Achaea
Soudena Theotokou, the former name of Ano Lousoi, Kalavryta municipality, Achaea
Ano Soudena, the former name of Ano Pedina, Ioannina regional unit
Kato Soudena, the former name of Kato Pedina, Ioannina regional unit